Admiral Bedford may refer to:

Arthur Bedford (1881–1949), British Royal Navy vice admiral
Frederick Bedford (1838–1913), British Royal Navy admiral
William Bedford (Royal Navy officer) (c. 1764–1827), British Royal Navy vice admiral